Río Ibáñez is a commune in General Carrera Province, Aisén Region, Chile. It is named after Ibáñez River, a major tributary of General Carrera Lake.

The commune includes the localities of Puerto Ingeniero Ibáñez, Villa Cerro Castillo, Bahía Murta, Puerto Eulogio Sánchez and Puerto Río Tranquilo.

Demographics
The population fell by 10.6% (295 persons) between the 1992 and 2002 censuses.

Administration
As a commune, Río Ibáñez is a third-level administrative division of Chile administered by a municipal council, headed by an alcalde who is directly elected every four years. The 2008-2012 alcalde is Luis Alarcón Escobar (UDI).

Within the electoral divisions of Chile, Río Ibáñez is represented in the Chamber of Deputies by René Alinco (PDC) and David Sandoval (UDI) as part of the 59th electoral district, which includes the entire Aisén Region. The commune is represented in the Senate by Antonio Horvath Kiss (RN) and Patricio Walker Prieto (PDC) as part of the 18th senatorial constituency (Aisén Region).

See also
Cerro Castillo National Reserve
Carretera Austral

References

External links
  Municipality of Río Ibáñez

Communes of Chile
Populated places in General Carrera Province